
This is a timeline of Belgian history, including important legal and territorial changes and political events in Belgium and its predecessor states. To read about the background to these events, see History of Belgium. See also the list of Belgian monarchs.

 Centuries BC: 1st  Centuries AD: 1st  2nd  3rd  4th  5th  6th  7th  8th  9th  10th  11th  12th  13th  14th  15th  16th  17th  18th  19th  20th  21st  Further: See also References  Further reading

1st century BC

1st century

2nd century

3rd century

4th century

5th century

6th century

7th century

8th century

9th century

10th century

11th century

12th century

13th century

14th century

15th century

16th century

17th century

18th century

19th century

20th century

21st century

See also
 History of Belgium
 History of Wallonia
 History of Flanders
 History of the Jews in Belgium
 Timeline of Burgundian and Habsburg acquisitions in the Low Countries
 List of Belgian historians

Cities in Belgium
 Timeline of Antwerp
 Timeline of Bruges
 Timeline of Brussels
 Timeline of Ghent
 Timeline of Leuven
 Timeline of Liège

References

Further reading

Belgian history
Paul Arblaster, A History of the Low Countries (Palgrave Essential Histories, 2012)
Samuel Humes, Belgium: Long United, Long Divided (Hurst, 2014)

Timelines

External links
 
History page at Belgian government web portal. Accessed 8 February 2015.
History page at Visit Belgium website. Accessed 8 February 2015.

Years in Belgium
Belgian